Stanley Battese (born 1936), also called Kehdoyah ("Follower" in Navajo), is a Navajo-American painter and printmaker born in Fort Defiance, Arizona. Primarily active in the 1950s and 1960s, he is known for his paintings and prints of animals and of Navajo figures. Battese has exhibited his work across the United States, including at the Inter-Tribal Indian Ceremonials, the Philbrook Museum of Art, and as part of the Museum of New Mexico's fine arts gallery tours. His works are in private collections and in the collections of institutions including the Smithsonian National Museum of Natural History.

Battese was born to Navajo parents Charlie Smith and Gee Eh Bah. He was adopted by Anthony Battese (Potawatomi) and Josephine Bruner (Muscogee-Shawnee). Battese began painting at a young age. He went on to earn a Bachelor of Arts from Arizona State College in Tempe, Arizona in 1961.

After exhibiting his art throughout the 1950s, Battese appears to have painted less frequently. He worked for a time as a carpenter and a welder.

External links 

 Stanley Battese art at the National Museum of Natural History
 Stanley Battese artwork from Santa Fe Auction

References 

20th-century American painters
20th-century indigenous painters of the Americas
Native American painters
Painters from Arizona
1936 births
Navajo painters
Arizona State University alumni
20th-century Native Americans
Living people